Kent Hughes may refer to:

 Henry Kent Hughes (c.1814–1880) pastoralist and politician in South Australia
 Wilfrid Kent Hughes (1895–1970), Australian soldier, Olympian and Olympic Games organiser, aka Kent Hughes
 R. Kent Hughes, American pastor and author
 Kent Hughes (ice hockey) NHL General Manager